In particle physics, the Lund string model is a phenomenological model of hadronization.  It treats all but the highest-energy gluons as field lines, which are attracted to each other due to the gluon self-interaction and so form a narrow tube (or string) of strong color field. Compared to electric or magnetic field lines, which are spread out because the carrier of the electromagnetic force, the photon, does not interact with itself.

String fragmentation is one of the parton fragmentation models used in the PYTHIA/Jetset and UCLA event generators, and explains many features of hadronization quite well.  In particular, the model predicts that in addition to the particle jets formed along the original paths of two separating quarks, there will be a spray of hadrons produced between the jets by the string itself—which is precisely what is observed.

This use of "string" is not the same as in string theory, in which strings are the fundamental objects of nature rather than collections of field lines.

See also
QCD string

References 
 

Quantum chromodynamics
Experimental particle physics